The Virgin Mountains are a mountain range of the northeastern Mojave Desert, located in Clark County, southeastern Nevada and Mohave County, northwestern Arizona.

Geography

Hydrologically, the range is located in the Lower Colorado—Lake Mead watershed. (USGS Huc 1501),

91.6% of the range is managed by the Bureau of Land Management, with a section of the Virgin Peak area designated within the BLM Virgin Mountain Natural Area.

Natural history
The range has many species of lizards, as well as the Panamint rattlesnake and glossy snake. Trees found in the range include Single-leaf pinyon pine (Pinus monophylla), Arizona cypress (Cupressus arizonica), White fir (Abies concolor), Douglas fir (Pseudotsuga menziesii), and Utah juniper (Juniperus osteosperma), and Rocky Mountain juniper (Juniperus scopulorum). The range has one endemic species of stick insect, Timema nevadense.

See also
Virgin Valley
Virgin River
Virgin River Gorge
Virgin River Narrows
South Virgin Mountains

References

External links

Mountain ranges of Nevada
Mountain ranges of Arizona
Mountain ranges of the Mojave Desert
Mountain ranges of Clark County, Nevada
Mountain ranges of Mohave County, Arizona
Protected areas of the Mojave Desert
Bureau of Land Management areas in Arizona
Bureau of Land Management areas in Nevada